Leif Mikael Andreas Yngvesson (born 18 August 1974) is a Swedish former professional footballer who played as a forward.

References

External links 
 

1974 births
Association football forwards
Swedish footballers
Allsvenskan players
GIF Sundsvall players
AIK Fotboll players
Malmö FF players
Landskrona BoIS players
Living people
People from Sundsvall
Sportspeople from Västernorrland County